Ekkachai Sumrei (born 28 November 1988) is a Thai professional footballer who plays as a right back or a right winger for Thai League 1 club Police Tero. His goal during the Thai League Week 11 against Bangkok Glass is considered one of the top 5 goals of the round in an article by FOX Sports Asia.

Club career

Thai Port
Ekkachai was successful playing at Port F.C.. He won the 2010 Thai League Cup after defeating Buriram PEA 2-1.

Buriram
He moved to Buriram in 2011 and won the 2011 Thai Division 1 League with the team.

Buriram United
Ekkachai later moved to Buriram United in 2012. On 29 May 2013, he scored two goals against Chonburi. On 11 August 2012, he scored a hat-trick against Chainat as Buriram won 7-2.

Ekkachai debuted in the 2013 AFC Champions League against Vegalta Sendai as a substitute. He continued to appear on the bench against Jiangsu Sainty in both legs. On 1 May 2013, he started the match against FC Seoul and scored a goal in the 56th minute. He later scored a header from Jirawat Makarom's free kick against Bunyodkor.

International career

Ekkachai played for Thailand U23 in the 2010 Asian Games in Guangzhou, China.
In March, 2015 he debuted for Thailand in a friendly match against Singapore.
In May 2015, he played for Thailand in the 2018 FIFA World Cup qualification (AFC) against Vietnam.

Style of Play

Ekkachai is known for his pace and his dribbling skills.

International

Honours

Clubs
Thai Port
 Thai FA Cup (1): 2009
 Thai League Cup (1): 2010

Buriram
 Thai Division 1 League (1): 2011

Buriram United
 Thai League T1 (1): 2013
 Thai FA Cup (2): 2012, 2013
 Thai League Cup (2): 2012, 2013
 Kor Royal Cup (1 : 2013

References

External links
 
Ekkachai Sumrei profile at Bangkok United website

1988 births
Living people
Ekkachai Sumrei
Ekkachai Sumrei
Association football wingers
Ekkachai Sumrei
Ekkachai Sumrei
Ekkachai Sumrei
Ekkachai Sumrei
Ekkachai Sumrei
Ekkachai Sumrei
Ekkachai Sumrei
Ekkachai Sumrei
Footballers at the 2010 Asian Games
Ekkachai Sumrei